Astrosarkus idipi is a species of sea stars in the family Oreasteridae. It is the sole species in the genus Astrosarkus. It is sometimes referred to as a "Pumpkin sea star".

Description and characteristics 
It is a big sea star with a subpentagonal and very plump body. It is quite recognizable because of its bright orange color, and globally displays the color, texture and size of a pumpkin. It is thus a very big star, measuring approximately 30 cm in diameter for 10 cm high. The lower face is white dirtied with orange, and crossed by 5 ambulacral grooves. Inside the body, the skeleton is strikingly reduced: the main part of the mass of the star is muscular.

Habitat and repartition 

This sea star lives in the sub-reef zone, between 67 and 200 m deep, and seems rather widely distributed in the Indo-pacific, From Reunion island to Samoa. However, it is still poorly known, and only 6 specimens have been collected to this day.

In popular culture 
Along with some other deep-sea creatures, this sea star has been used in Japan as a model for a sushi-shaped gachapon toy. There, the species is referred as ryugu sakura hitode,  which means "dragon palace cherry blossom sea star".

References

Oreasteridae
Animals described in 2003
Monotypic echinoderm genera
Asteroidea genera